Ball Green is a small village in Stoke-on-Trent. Ball Green is in the suburb of Chell near to Burslem.

References

Villages in Staffordshire